Patong Girl is a 2014 German-Thai film written and directed by Susanna Salonen.  The film premiered on the Festival of German film in Ludwigshafen. It was theatrically released in Germany on 25 December 2014 and in Thailand 21 April 2016. The film premiered in the U.S. at the Austin Film Festival  2014.

Plot

The German Schroeder family spends their Christmas holidays on the Thai island of Phuket, and in one of the sleazy bars of Patong Beach, 18-year-old son Felix falls in love with a young, gorgeous Thai woman. Felix's brother Tommy is sure that Fai is a prostitute, his parents are uneasy about Felix's love for her, too. After a tearful goodbye at the end of the holidays, Felix spontaneously decides to follow his heart - and to stay in Thailand. Alarmed, his mother Annegret forfeits her return ticket - she will not leave Felix by himself in this foreign country with a "prostitute". Felix joins Fai on the bus to her home town in Isaan. During the bus-ride he learns that Fai is not exactly the woman he thought she was - fearing rejection, Fai had not revealed her transgender identity.  Meanwhile, Annegret is looking for her son.

Cast

 Max Mauff as Felix
 Aisawanya Areyawattana as Fai
 Victoria Trauttmansdorff as Annegret
 Uwe Preuss as Ulrich
 Marcel Glauche as Tommy

Reception
In 2016, Patong Girl was awarded the German Grimme-Award for screenplay, directing, production and main cast.

References

External links
 
 Patong Girl - official webpage

2014 films
2014 comedy-drama films
2014 romance films
2014 LGBT-related films
2010s German films
German comedy-drama films
German romance films
Thai comedy-drama films
Thai romance films
German LGBT-related films
Thai LGBT-related films
Films set in Phuket
Transgender-related films